Bílé Podolí is a market town in Kutná Hora District in the Central Bohemian Region of the Czech Republic. It has about 600 inhabitants.

Administrative parts
Villages of Lovčice and Zaříčany are administrative parts of Bílé Podolí. Lovčice forms an exclave of the municipal territory.

Geography
It lies in a flat agricultural landscape of the Central Elbe Table. The Doubrava River flows along the western municipal border.

History
The first written mention of Bílé Podolí is from 1307. The village was promoted to a market town in 1687 by Emperor Leopold I.

Sights
The landmark of Bílé Podolí is the Church of Saint Wenceslaus. It was built in the late Gothic style probably at the end of the 14th century. The early Baroque reconstruction took place in the 1670s, further modifications were made after the fire in 1713. In 1821, the church was rebuilt into its curent form with a Neoclassical façade.

References

External links

Populated places in Kutná Hora District
Market towns in the Czech Republic